Tamicka Clarke (born 9 November 1980) is a Bahamian sprinter who specializes in the 100 metres. Her personal best time is 11.26 seconds, achieved in June 2007 in Atlanta, Georgia.
 
She finished fourth in 4 x 100 metres relay at the 2004 Summer Olympics, with teammates Chandra Sturrup, Shandria Brown and Debbie Ferguson.

Clarke represented the Bahamas at the 2008 Summer Olympics in Beijing competing at the 100 metres sprint. In her first round heat she placed sixth in a time of 12.16 which was not enough to advance to the second round.

Clarke was coached by coach Henry Rolle.

References

1980 births
Living people
Bahamian female sprinters
Athletes (track and field) at the 2002 Commonwealth Games
Athletes (track and field) at the 2003 Pan American Games
Athletes (track and field) at the 2004 Summer Olympics
Athletes (track and field) at the 2008 Summer Olympics
Olympic athletes of the Bahamas
Pan American Games competitors for the Bahamas
Commonwealth Games medallists in athletics
Commonwealth Games gold medallists for the Bahamas
Central American and Caribbean Games medalists in athletics
Olympic female sprinters
Auburn Tigers women's track and field athletes
Auburn University alumni
Medallists at the 2002 Commonwealth Games